The Nieuport-Delage Sesquiplans were a series of 1920s French racing monoplanes built by Nieuport-Delage. It was the first aircraft to be recorded as achieving 200 mph (321.88 km/h) in level flight and it established a world air speed record in 1923, attaining an airspeed of 205.2 mph (330.275 km/h).

Development

The Sesquiplane first appeared in 1921, a development of the Nieuport 31 fighter. It was a sleek shoulder-wing braced monoplane powered by a supercharged 8 cylinder  Hispano-Suiza 8Fb engine.  The name Sesquiplane was due to the additional aerofoil that was attached to the axle of the fixed conventional landing gear.

Two Sesquiplans were built and both were entered into the Coupe Deutsch de la Meurthe speed event held at Etampes in October 1921. The aircraft flown by Sadi-Lecointe crashed during the race but the other, piloted by Georges Kirsch, won at an average speed of 278.36 km/h (173 mph). The following year Lacointe crashed again in a Sesquiplan with a new squared off wing of similar span and with a Göttingen 416 airfoil section replacing the original wing, having set a new world record speed of 325 kmh (202 mph) over 100 km (62 mi). 
The surviving aircraft was modified with a 400 hp (298 kW) Wright Hispano H-3 engine and a revised vertical tail, possibly becoming the Nieuport NiD 41 (sources differ on the identity of the NiD 41) and named Eugène Gilbert. Flush radiators made of thin corrugated brass welded together covered most of the wing and replaced the Lamblin radiators used previously. In February 1923 Lecointe set a new world speed record of 375 kmh (233 mph) at Istres in it.

The last racing Sesquiplan, the Nieuport-Delage NiD 42 S was a new design, fitted with a 12-cylinder  Hispano 12Hb engine.

Specifications (Eugène Gilbert)

See also

References

Notes

Bibliography

1920s French sport aircraft
Sesquiplan
Shoulder-wing aircraft
Single-engined tractor aircraft
Aircraft first flown in 1921
Sesquiplanes